Giovanni Filippo Galvagno (1801 – 1874) was an Italian lawyer and politician. He served in the Chamber of Deputies and Senate of the Kingdom of Sardinia. He was mayor of Turin under the Kingdom of Italy.

References

19th-century Italian lawyers
19th-century Italian politicians
Mayors of Turin
Deputies of Legislature I of the Kingdom of Sardinia
Deputies of Legislature III of the Kingdom of Sardinia
Deputies of Legislature IV of the Kingdom of Sardinia
Deputies of Legislature V of the Kingdom of Sardinia
Deputies of Legislature VI of the Kingdom of Sardinia
Members of the Senate of the Kingdom of Sardinia
1801 births
1874 deaths